This page shows the results of leadership elections in the Progressive Conservative Party of Saskatchewan, Canada, (known as the Conservative Party of Saskatchewan until the mid-1940s).  The 1994 convention was determined by a "one member, one vote" system of balloting; all previous conventions were determined by delegated conventions.

1905 Provincial Rights leadership convention

(Held on August 23, 1905.)

Frederick W. A. G. Haultain acclaimed

1924 Conservative leadership convention

(Held on March 25, 1924.)

James T. M. Anderson acclaimed

1936 Conservative leadership convention

(Held on October 28, 1936.)

John Diefenbaker acclaimed

1942 Conservative leadership convention

(Held on June 18, 1942.)

KEOWN H.E. elected
BURROWS, C.H.J.

(Note:  The vote totals do not appear to have been announced.)

1944 Progressive Conservative leadership convention

(Held on February 15, 1944.)

Rupert Ramsay acclaimed

1949 Progressive Conservative leadership convention

(Held on October 12, 1949.)

Alvin Hamilton
HUDSON, Ed

(Note:  The vote totals were not announced, although Hamilton is believed to have won in a landslide.)

1958 Progressive Conservative leadership convention

(Held on October 28, 1958).

First ballot:

Martin Pederson 369
Gib Eamer 283
M.A. Sandy MacPherson 238

Second ballot:

Martin Pederson 536
Gib Eamer 313

1970 Progressive Conservative leadership convention

(Held on February 28, 1970.)

Ed Nasserden
Martin Clary

(Note:  The vote totals were not released.  250 votes were cast, in total.)

1973 Progressive Conservative leadership convention

(Held on March 18, 1973.)

Dick Collver
Roy Bailey

(Note: The vote totals were not released, and there were wildly conflicting unofficial reports as to the size of Collver's victory (ranging from 67% ballot support to a mere 16-vote difference). A total of 495 ballots were cast in total.)

1979 Progressive Conservative leadership convention

(Held on November 9, 1979.)

Grant Devine 418
Graham Taylor 201
Paul Emile Rousseau 74

1994 Progressive Conservative leadership convention

(Held on November 21, 1994.)

Bill Boyd 1,985
Grant Schmidt 1,313

See also
Progressive Conservative Party of Saskatchewan
leadership convention

Progressive Conservative